Visakhapatnam is the largest City of the Indian state Andhra Pradesh and asll so called as City of Destiny  in the state of Andhra Pradesh compare to other cities Visakhapatnam has more tourist places and total  tourism income of the state Visakhapatnam tourisam contributes 40% of the income. Central Visakhapatnam has main tourist places like RK Beach, Beach Road, Kailasagiri and APSRTC runs special tourist buses for city tour.

Attractions

Parks

 Kailasagiri is a famous hill top park and one of the highest tourist visited place in the city.It spreads out to 380 acres with facilities like rope way, mini train and well connected buses are also available.

 Dr.Y.S.Rajasekhara Reddy Central Park is Central park located in city center Dwaraka Nagar area. This park is good connected with all parts of city and have musical fountain, Cycle track, Yoga center and running track 

 VUDA Park this park is besides sea and one of the famous park in the state, this park is famous for skating track and boating

Zoo park and Wildlife Sanctuary 

 Kambalakonda Wildlife Sanctuary is Wildlife Sanctuary located near city and its lifeline of city because this Wildlife Sanctuary plays key role in Visakhapatnam city environment and this place famous for trekking.
 Kondakarla Ava is lake and birds Sanctuary this lake is destination for migrant birds and seasonal destination for birds, and it a good picnic spot for public

Beaches

 Rushikonda Beach is  popular tourist destination and cleanest beach in the city, this beach revived Blue Flag beach and one of the rarest beach India achieved this feat 
 Yarada Beach is one of the beautiful beach situated South visakhapatnam

Religious places

 Simhachalam temple is one of the ancient and richest temple in Andhra Pradesh and its major religious center for Hinduism in Visakhapatnam 
 Kanaka Maha Lakshmi Temple is located in Burujupeta in Old town area the people of Visakhapatnam adore the god as locale god especially Women Devotes
 Sri Sampath Vinayagar Temple is situated Asilmetta area
 ISKCON Temple located Sagar Nagar  in North Visakhapatnam
 Kali Temple is one of the landmark in RK Beach and Beach Road
 Someswara Swamy Temple is located in Appikonda its 11th century temple constructed by Chola Kings primary deity is lord Shiva

Museums

 Visakha Museum is located in Beach Road and its treasure of ancient culture
 Telugu Samskruthika Niketanam is a Telugu Museum and its on Kailasagiri the main aim of this museum is to  explore culture of Telugu people, Telugu literature and Telugu language
 TU 142 Aircraft Museum is aircraft museum at RK Beach
 INS Kursura Museum is one of the first submarine museum in Asia located at Beach road

War Memorials
 Victory at Sea Memorial is a war memorial this memorial constructed for Indo-Pakistani War of 1971
 Vijaya stambha this pillar setup by Krishnadevaraya ruler of Vijayanagara Empire he won against Gajapati Empire in battle of Potnuru

Shopping
 CMR Central
 CENTRAL, Visakhapatnam
 Jagadamba Centre  
 Town Kotha Road

events
 Visakha Utsav  a carnival celebrates every year in December and January month conducted by Andhra Pradesh Tourism Development Corporation and Visakhapatnam Metropolitan Region Development Authority
 Navy Day is celebrated annually victory over Pakistan
 Balloon Festival

See also 
 Tourism in Andhra Pradesh

References

 
B
B